Wanmin (万民乡) is a township in the northwest Hunan province of China.

See also 
 List of township-level divisions of Hunan

References

Divisions of Yongshun County
Townships of Hunan